Edward Edgar Pescott (11 December 1872 – 31 July 1954) was an Australian naturalist.  He was Principal Governor of the Burnley School of Horticulture from 1909 to 1916, and Government Pomologist for the Victorian Department of Agriculture from 1917 to 1937. He was a Fellow of the Linnean Society of London

In the early 1920s Pescott became widely known through weekly radio broadcasts.

Books
 Native Flowers of Victoria 1914, 
 The Dahlia in Australia 1920
 Bulb Growing in Australia 1926
 Gardening in Australia 1926 
 Rose Growing in Australia 1928
 Wild Flowers of Australia 1929
 New Way Gardening 1933

External links
 Entry from Australian Dictionary of Biography
 Biographical entry at University of Melbourne

1872 births
1954 deaths
Botanists active in Australia
Australian horticulturists
People from Geelong
Australian naturalists
Fellows of the Linnean Society of London